The Broker's Building is an historic structure located at 404 Market Street in the Gaslamp Quarter, San Diego, in the U.S. state of California. It was built in 1889 by Barnett McDougal.

See also
 List of Gaslamp Quarter historic buildings

References

External links

 

1889 establishments in California
Buildings and structures completed in 1889
Buildings and structures in San Diego
Gaslamp Quarter, San Diego